Quinone-interacting membrane-bound oxidoreductase is a membrane-bound protein complex present in the electron transport chain of sulfate reducers (e.g. Desulfovibrio species) and some sulfur oxidizers.

It was first described by  Pires et al. (2003).

References 

Cellular respiration
Integral membrane proteins
Oxidoreductases